Barrie Edginton (born 30 March 1967) is a British windsurfer. He competed in the men's Lechner A-390 event at the 1992 Summer Olympics. He is a member of the iQFOIL Executive Committee.

References

External links
 
 
 Barrie Edgington at SailRacer
 
 

1967 births
Living people
English windsurfers
British male sailors (sport)
Olympic sailors of Great Britain
Sailors at the 1992 Summer Olympics – Lechner A-390
People from Wokingham
Sportspeople from Berkshire